Tamara Lynne Hilliard (née Hext; born May 1, 1963) is a beauty queen from Texas who has competed at Miss America.

Hext won the title Miss Texas 1984, after competing in that pageant as Miss Arlington.  She went on to become a finalist in the nationally televised Miss America pageant that same year, and finished as the 4th runner up. Tamara attended Vidor High School.

Tamara Hext also was a film actress. Hext appeared in a co-starring role in a horror-film called "Through the Fire" (1988).

Personal
Hext is married to Jim Hilliard, who played for the Texas Longhorns football team and was an orthopedic surgeon for 35 years. In March 2018, Jim Hilliard was diagnosed with amyotrophic lateral sclerosis. The couple raised three sons, the youngest of whom, Sam Hilliard, is a professional baseball player.

References

External links

1963 births
Living people
Miss America 1980s delegates
Miss America Preliminary Swimsuit winners